The 2017 Dubai Sevens was the first tournament within the 2017–18 World Rugby Women's Sevens Series. It was on 30 November to 1 December at The Sevens Stadium in Dubai, United Arab Emirates.

Format
The teams are drawn into three pools of four teams each. Each team plays every other team in their pool once. The top two teams from each pool advance to the Cup brackets while the top 2 third place teams also compete in the Cup/Plate. The other teams from each group play-off for the Challenge Trophy.

Teams
Eleven core teams are participating in the tournament along with one invited team, the winner of the 2017 Women's Africa Cup Sevens, South Africa:

Pool stage
All times in UAE Standard Time (UTC+4:00)

Pool A

Pool B

Pool C

Knockout round

Challenge Trophy

5th place

Cup

Tournament placings

Source: World Rugby

Players

Scoring leaders

Source: World Rugby

Dream Team
The following seven players were selected to the tournament Dream Team at the conclusion of the tournament:

See also
 2017 Dubai Sevens (for men)

References

2017–18
2017–18 World Rugby Women's Sevens Series
rugby union
2017 in women's rugby union
2017 rugby sevens competitions
2017 in Asian rugby union
Dubai Women's Sevens
Dubai Women's Sevens